Skogsvallen is a sports ground in Luleå, Sweden and the home stadium for the football team IFK Luleå. It was inaugurated in 1957.

Skogsvallen has a total capacity of 2,500 spectators. It was an Allsvenskan venue for one season in 1971 when IFK Luleå played in the top tier league.

References 

Football venues in Sweden
Sport in Luleå
Sports venues completed in 1957
1957 establishments in Sweden